is a Japanese technique related to pollarding, used on Cryptomeria trees. The term roughly translates to "platform cedar".

Shoots from the base of the tree are pruned so that the trunk stays straight. It is believed that the production of logs by  began in the Muromachi period. At that time, the tea ceremony became popular in part because  logs were used in tea room construction, for example for the  alcove.

In the 14th century, a form of very straight and stylized Sukiya-zukuri architecture was highly fashionable in Japan. However, there simply were not enough raw materials around to build these homes for every noble or samurai who wanted one. Hence, the  technique of applying bonsai pruning techniques to full-scale trees was developed.

The technique results in a harvest of straight logs without having to cut down the entire tree. Although originally a forestry management technique,  has also found its way into Japanese gardens.

References

External links 
 

Japanese style of gardening
Japanese words and phrases
Horticultural techniques
Forestry in Japan
Forest management